
Year 333 BC was a year of the pre-Julian Roman calendar. At the time, it was known as the Year of the Dictatorship of Rufinus (or, less frequently, year 421 Ab urbe condita). The denomination 333 BC for this year has been used since the early medieval period, when the Anno Domini calendar era became the prevalent method in Europe for naming years.

Events 
 By place 

 Macedonia 
 King Alexander of Macedonia conquers western Asia Minor, subduing the hill tribes of Lycia and Pisidia.
 King Darius III of Persia executes Charidemus, a Greek mercenary leader living in exile in Persia, for criticising preparations taken for the Battle of Issus.
 Alexander has a great victory over the Persians in the Battle of the Issus River in Cilicia, but the Persian Emperor Darius III escapes. Darius leaves behind his wife, his two daughters, his mother Sisygambis, and much of his personal treasure. Darius' family is captured by Alexander and well treated.
 Alexander makes one of his officers, Nearchus, satrap of the newly conquered Lycia and Pamphylia in Anatolia and he appoints his general, Antigonus, satrap of Phrygia.
 From Issus, Alexander marches south into Syria and Phoenicia, his object being to isolate the Persian fleet from its bases and so to destroy it as an effective fighting force. The Phoenician cities of Marathus and Aradus do not resist Alexander's armies. Parmenion is sent ahead to try to secure Damascus and its rich booty, including Darius' war chest.
 After taking Byblos and Sidon, Alexander lays siege to Tyre.
 In reply to a letter from Darius offering peace, Alexander demands Darius' unconditional surrender.

Births

Deaths 
 Charidemus, Greek mercenary leader
 Memnon of Rhodes, Greek mercenary leader (b. 380 BC)

References